Morte (Italian and Portuguese for "death") may also refer to:

Morte (river), France
La Morte, commune in the Isère department in southeastern France
La Morte, French novel by Octave Feuillet 1866
Morte (Planescape), character in Dungeons & Dragons video game
Luís Boa Morte (1977), Portuguese professional football coach
Morte Point, Devon

See also
La morte d'Orfeo (The Death of Orpheus), a 1619 opera by Stefano Landi
Le Morte d'Arthur (The Death of Arthur), a 1485 book by Thomas Malory